This is the discography of Irish musician Damien Dempsey.

Albums

Studio albums

Live albums

Compilation albums

EPs
 Contender EP (1995)
 Negative Vibes EP (2002)
 No Force On Earth EP (2018)

Video albums

Singles

Featured singles

Notable compilation appearances
 It's All Bells: Jingle All the Way (2002) - "Fairytale of New York" (with Sinéad O'Connor)
 Even Better Than the Real Thing Vol. 1 (2003) - "I Believe in a Thing Called Love"
 Even Better Than the Real Thing Vol. 3 (2005) - "Sunday Bloody Sunday"
 Ceol '07 (2007) - "Taobh Leis An Muir", an Irish language version of Beside The Sea	
 Music of Ireland: Welcome Home (2010) - "Maasai Returns"

Guest appearances

References

External links

Discographies of Irish artists
Folk music discographies
Rock music discographies